Erik Kimrey (born August 1, 1979) is an American football coach and former player who is currently the head coach at Baylor School in Chattanooga, Tennessee. Prior to his appointment at Baylor, Kimrey served as the tight ends coach at the University of South Carolina, where he was a backup quarterback from 1998–2002. Prior to accepting his first collegiate coaching position at South Carolina, Kimrey was the head football coach at Hammond School from 2003 to 2020, where his teams won 12 state titles in 17 seasons.

Early life 
Kimrey grew up in Columbia, South Carolina and graduated from Dutch Fork High School in Irmo, South Carolina, where his father, Bill, was the head varsity football coach. In his senior year, Kimrey set several state records and was named the state's Offensive Player of the Year.

Playing career 
At the request of then-coach Brad Scott, Kimrey walked on to play quarterback for the South Carolina Gamecocks in 1998 and was named as a backup. After Scott was fired, Kimrey remained on the roster under Lou Holtz for the following three seasons. As a player, Kimrey is best known for coming off the bench to throw a fourth down game-clenching fade route touchdown pass to Jermale Kelly in the final minutes of the 2000 game against Mississippi State after the injury of starting quarterback Phil Petty. The touchdown pass became the central subject of the 2017 documentary about Kimrey, "Erik Kimrey: The Fade."

Coaching career 
After graduating with a Bachelor of Arts in mathematics, Kimrey worked as a University of South Carolina football graduate assistant under Holtz for two years before accepting the role of head coach at Hammond School in Columbia, where he remained for 17 seasons.  During his time as head coach, Hammond won 12 state titles and had an overall record of 194-20. Kimrey was the youngest and fastest high school football coach in state history to win 100 games, and the only coach in state history to win six consecutive state championships. In addition to coaching, Kimrey taught philosophy of religion and physical education.

South Carolina
On December 27, 2020, Kimrey joined the University of South Carolina football staff as tight ends coach under head coach Shane Beamer. On February 2, 2022, Beamer announced that Kimrey had left the program. On February 3, 2022, Kimrey was announced as Head Coach of the Baylor School in Chattanooga, Tennessee.

Personal life 
Kimrey is married to his high school girlfriend, Erica. Together the couple has three children, Kaitlyn Dean, Karis, and Ty. He has three brothers.

References

External links 

 South Carolina Gamecocks coaching bio

1979 births
21st-century American educators
Living people
American football quarterbacks
Coaches of American football from South Carolina
High school football coaches in South Carolina
Players of American football from Columbia, South Carolina
Sportspeople from Columbia, South Carolina
South Carolina Gamecocks football players
South Carolina Gamecocks football coaches